Frederick Schiller (23 August 1901 – 29 September 1994) was an Austrian-born British film actor. He appeared in more than 70 films from 1944 to 1985.

Filmography

Film

Television

References

External links
 
 

1901 births
1994 deaths
Male actors from Vienna
British male film actors
20th-century British male actors
Austrian emigrants to the United Kingdom